Tavistock was the name of a parliamentary constituency in Devon between 1330 and 1974. Until 1885 it was a parliamentary borough, consisting solely of the town of Tavistock; it returned two Members of Parliament to the House of Commons of the Parliament of the United Kingdom until 1868, when its representation was reduced to one member. From 1885, the name was transferred to a single-member county constituency covering a much larger area. (Between 1885 and 1918, the constituency had the alternative name of West Devon.)

The constituency was abolished for the February 1974 general election, when it was largely replaced by the new West Devon constituency.

Boundaries
1885–1918: The Municipal Boroughs of Devonport and Plymouth, and the Sessional Divisions of Hatherleigh, Holsworthy, Lifton, Midland Roborough, and Tavistock.

1918–1950: The Urban Districts of Holsworthy, Ivybridge, and Tavistock, the Rural Districts of Broadwoodwidger, Plympton St Mary, and Tavistock, and part of the Rural District of Holsworthy.

1950–1974: The Urban Districts of Holsworthy and Tavistock, the Rural Districts of Broadwoodwidger, Holsworthy, and Tavistock, and part of the Rural District of Plympton St Mary.

In 1965 Tavistock was one of the largest seats in England, in terms of land area. It included the towns of Plympton and Plymstock (effectively eastern suburbs of Plymouth). It also included a great deal of rural land, including two-thirds of Dartmoor.

Members of Parliament

MPs 1295–1640

MPs 1640–1868

MPs 1868–1974

Elections

Elections in the 1830s

Fortescue chose to sit for  where he had also been elected, causing a by-election.

William Russell resigned, causing a by-election.

Elections in the 1840s

Rundle resigned by accepting the office of Steward of the Chiltern Hundreds, causing a by-election.

Elections in the 1850s
Trelawny resigned to seek re-election after voting against the disestablishment of the Church of England when he had promised his constituents he would vote for it.

 

On petition, Carter was unseated in 1853 and Phillimore was declared elected in his place.

 

Byng resigned in order to contest a by-election in Middlesex, causing a by-election.

Elections in the 1860s

 

Seat reduced to one member

Elections in the 1870s

Elections in the 1880s

Elections in the 1890s

Elections in the 1900s

Elections in the 1910s 

General Election 1914–15:

Another General Election was required to take place before the end of 1915. The political parties had been making preparations for an election to take place and by the July 1914, the following candidates had been selected; 
Unionist: John Spear
Liberal: Oliver Brett

Elections in the 1920s

Elections in the 1930s

Elections in the 1940s 
General Election 1939–40:

Another General Election was required to take place before the end of 1940. The political parties had been making preparations for an election to take place from 1939 and by the end of this year, the following candidates had been selected; 
Conservative: Colin Patrick 
Liberal: Frank Milton 
Labour: J Finnigan

Elections in the 1950s

Elections in the 1960s

Elections in the 1970s

References 

Robert Beatson, A Chronological Register of Both Houses of Parliament (London: Longman, Hurst, Res & Orme, 1807)
D Brunton & D H Pennington, Members of the Long Parliament (London: George Allen & Unwin, 1954)
Cobbett's Parliamentary history of England, from the Norman Conquest in 1066 to the year 1803 (London: Thomas Hansard, 1808)
 The Constitutional Year Book for 1913 (London: National Union of Conservative and Unionist Associations, 1913)
F W S Craig, British Parliamentary Election Results 1832-1885 (2nd edition, Aldershot: Parliamentary Research Services, 1989)
 F W S Craig, British Parliamentary Election Results 1918-1949 (Glasgow: Political Reference Publications, 1969)
 Michael Crick, Michael Heseltine: A Biography, Hamish Hamilton, 1997, .
 Maija Jansson (ed.), Proceedings in Parliament, 1614 (House of Commons) (Philadelphia: American Philosophical Society, 1988)
 J E Neale, The Elizabethan House of Commons (London: Jonathan Cape, 1949)
 J Holladay Philbin, Parliamentary Representation 1832 - England and Wales (New Haven: Yale University Press, 1965)
Henry Stooks Smith, The Parliaments of England from 1715 to 1847 (2nd edition, edited by FWS Craig - Chichester: Parliamentary Reference Publications, 1973)
 

Parliamentary constituencies in Devon (historic)
Constituencies of the Parliament of the United Kingdom disestablished in 1974
Constituencies of the Parliament of the United Kingdom established in 1295
Constituencies of the Parliament of the United Kingdom established in 1330
Tavistock